La Ferrière or Laferrière may refer to:

Places

France 
La Ferrière, Côtes-d'Armor, in the Côtes-d'Armor département
La Ferrière, Indre-et-Loire, in the Indre-et-Loire département
La Ferrière, Isère, in the Isère département
La Ferrière, Vendée, in the Vendée département
La Ferrière-Airoux, in the Vienne département
La Ferrière-au-Doyen, in the Orne département
La Ferrière-aux-Étangs, in the Orne département
La Ferrière-Béchet, in the Orne département
La Ferrière-Bochard, in the Orne département
La Ferrière-de-Flée, in the Maine-et-Loire département
La Ferrière-en-Parthenay, in the Deux-Sèvres département
La Ferrière-Harang, in the Calvados département
La Ferrière-sur-Risle, in the Eure département

Other places
Citadelle Laferrière, a large mountaintop fortress in Nord, Haiti
La Ferrière, Switzerland, in the canton of Bern

See also 
 Laferrière
Ferrières (disambiguation)